A Classic Christmas is the first Christmas album from American country music artist Wynonna Judd. It features her renditions of traditional Christmas tunes, and one newly written track, "It's the Messiah". Her version of "Santa Claus Is Coming to Town" and "Winter Wonderland" respectively reached #3 and #18 on the Hot Adult Contemporary Tracks charts in 2006.

Track listing

Personnel 
 Wynonna Judd – lead vocals
 David Huntsinger – acoustic piano
 Steve Nathan – pianos 
 Don Potter – acoustic guitar, electric guitars 
 Craig Nelson – upright bass
 Eddie Bayers – drums
 Paul Leim – drums
 Charlie McCoy – harmonica
 Calvin Smith – French horn
 Bill Woodworth – English horn, oboe
 Cindy Reynolds Wyatt – harp
 Lisa Cochran – backing vocals
 Vicki Hampton – backing vocals
 Mark Ivey – backing vocals
 Marabeth Jordan – backing vocals
 Elijah Judd – backing vocals
 Grace Judd – backing vocals
 Jenna Maher – backing vocals
 Lisa Silver – backing vocals
 Bergen White – backing vocals 

The Nashville String Machine
 Bergen White – string arrangements and conductor
 Lori Casteel, Mike Casteel and Eberhard Ramm – music copyists
 Carl Gorodetzky – string contractor
 David Angell, Monisa Angell, Janet Askey, Bruce Christensen, David Davidson, Conni Ellisor, Julia Emahsier, Carl Gorodetzky, Jim Grosjean, Jack Jezzro, Anthony LaMarchina, Cate Myer, Carole Neuen-Rabinowitz, Keith Nicholas, Lynn Peithman, Joel Reist, Sarighani Reist, Pamela Sixfin, Calvin Smith, Julie Tanner, Alan Umstead, Catherine Umstead, Gary Vanosdale, Mary Kathryn Vanosdale and Kristin Wilkinson – string players

Choir
 Lisa Cochran, Travis Cottrell, Vicki Hampton, Mark Ivey, Marabeth Jordan, Shane McConnell, Louis Dean Nunley, Lisa Silver and Kira Small

Production 
 Brent Maher – producer, arrangements, engineer, mixing 
 Don Potter – producer, arrangements
 Brian Krause – engineer 
 Charles Yingling – engineer 
 Hank Williams – mastering at MasterMix (Nashville, Tennessee)
 Crystal Hooper – production coordinator 
 Joy Patterson – set designer
 Glenn Sweitzer – art direction, design 
 Kristin Barlowe – photography
 Kerry Hansen – management 
 Tami Olin – management
 Jennifer Witherell – management
 Mitch Barry – hair stylist 
 Angela Cay Hall – make-up
 Renee Layher – wardrobe stylist

Charts

External links
Wynonna Looks Backward for a Classic Christmas

Wynonna Judd albums
Asylum-Curb Records albums
2006 Christmas albums
Albums produced by Brent Maher
Christmas albums by American artists
Country Christmas albums